Karaağaç is a town in Kapaklı district of Tekirdağ Province, Turkey. The population of Karaağaç  is 10601  as of 2011. As it is true with other towns around, Karaağaç, formerly an agricultural town is now a settlement of industrial area.  
.

References

Populated places in Tekirdağ Province
Towns in Turkey